Fairbank's changes describe the radiological changes observed on an AP radiograph of the knee after meniscectomy.

Fairbank identified significant changes including squaring of the femoral condyles, peak eminences, ridging, and joint space narrowing.

References

Musculoskeletal radiographic signs